Sir Henry Bingham, 1st Baronet (1573 – c. 1658) was an Irish politician.

Born at Milton Abbas, he was the son of Sir George Bingham, brother of Sir Richard Bingham, and his wife Cicely Martin, daughter of Robert Martin. Bingham served as captain in the Irish Army. He was nominated High Sheriff of County Galway in 1607 and High Sheriff of Mayo in 1639. He entered the Irish House of Commons in 1634, representing Castlebar in the next five years until he retired because of ill health. On 7 June 1632, Bingham was created a baronet, of Castlebar, in the County of Mayo by King Charles I of England.

By 1625, he married Catherine Byrne, daughter of John Byrne, and had by her a son and a daughter. Bingham died by 1658 and was buried in Castlebar. He was succeeded in the baronetcy by his son George.

References

1573 births
1650s deaths
Bingham Baronets, of Castlebar
High Sheriffs of County Galway
High Sheriffs of Mayo
Politicians from County Mayo
Members of the Parliament of Ireland (pre-1801) for County Mayo constituencies
16th-century Anglo-Irish people
17th-century Anglo-Irish people
Irish MPs 1634–1635
Kingdom of England people in the Kingdom of Ireland